Love gone is the 12th single of the Japanese singer Miho Komatsu. released under Giza studio label. It was released 31 January 2001. The single reached #26 rank first week and sold 15,020. It charted for two weeks and sold totally 19,640 copies.

Track list
All songs are written and composed by Miho Komatsu and arranged by Yoshinobu Ohga
"Love gone"
the song was used as an ending theme for both TBS show Kokoro TV and P.S. ~Pop Shake~.
single version and album version have different arrangements

"Love gone" (instrumental)

References 

2001 singles
Miho Komatsu songs
Songs written by Miho Komatsu
2001 songs
Giza Studio singles
Being Inc. singles
Song recordings produced by Daiko Nagato